The Maharashtra State Board of Secondary and Higher Secondary Education is a statutory and autonomous body established under the "Maharashtra Secondary Boards Act" 1965 (amended in 1977). Most important task of the board, among few others, is to conduct the SSC for 10th class and HSC for 12th class examinations. It is the most popular education board in terms of enrollment in high school in India only after the Central Board of Secondary Education.

History 
The Board came into existence on 1 January 1966 to regulate certain matters pertaining to secondary education in the state of Maharashtra, as "Maharashtra State Secondary Education Boards". The act was amended in 1976, and the name of the Board changed to its present name, "Maharashtra State Board of Secondary and Higher Secondary Education".

Functions

The board is responsible for formation, and implementation of the rules and regulations in accordance to the guidelines set by the state as well as central boards. It is also in charge, autonomously, of, and implementation of the syllabus/curriculum of all the grades, textbooks, exam schedule, and type. The board is also responsible for creation of textbooks, scoring of the centralised tests, and conducting examinations fairly and providing unbiased justice in the event of dispute.

The Board conducts examination twice a year and the number of students appearing for the main examination is around 1,400,000 for Higher Secondary Certificate (HSC) and 1,700,000 for Secondary School Certificate (SSC) every year.

The exams are usually held in the months of March, July, and October every year; and results are given out usually in June, and January respectively. March marks the end of educational year, and June marks beginning of the new educational year in the state of Maharashtra.

Divisional boards 
There are nine divisional boards with the state to represent the state board. Their duties include, but not limited to:
 Decide the schools/colleges to conduct the final exams.
 Appoint the paper setters, translators, custodians (of question papers, and blank and filled up answer papers), conductors (transportation), and examiners (paper checkers).

There are nine divisional boards located at Amravati, Aurangabad, Kolhapur, Konkan, Latur, Mumbai, Nagpur, Nashik, and Pune.

References

External links
 Official website
 Official website for Result Declaration and Checking

Education in Maharashtra
State secondary education boards of India
1966 establishments in Maharashtra
Government agencies established in 1966